Glad Rag Doll  is a 1929 American Pre-Code drama film directed by Michael Curtiz and starring Dolores Costello, Ralph Graves and Audrey Ferris. This is one of many lost films of the 1920s, no prints or Vitaphone discs survive, but the song with the same title and the trailer survives. The film's working title was Alimony Annie, but was changed match the title song. The song is both played and sung throughout the soundtrack.

Synopsis
Jimmy Fairchild, the younger son of an upper-class Philadelphia family, is besotted with Annabel Lee who is starring in a Broadway revue. His older brother John is outraged and arranges to have her fired from the show. Using compromising letters written by Jimmy she blackmails her way into their house. Despite their initial antagonism she and John fall in love.

Cast
 Dolores Costello as Annabel Lee
 Ralph Graves as John Fairchild
 Audrey Ferris as Bertha Fairchild
 Albert Gran as Nathan Fairchild
 Maude Turner Gordon as Aunt Fairchild
 Tom Ricketts as Admiral
 Claude Gillingwater as Sam Underlane
 Arthur Rankin as Jimmy Fairchild
 Dale Fuller as Miss Peabody
 Douglas Gerrard as Butler
 George Beranger as Barry, an actor
 Lee Moran as Press Agent
 Tom Kennedy as Manager
 Louise Beavers as Hannah

Reception
According to Warner Bros records the film earned $735,000 domestically and $275,000 foreign. This was a major financial success, was very profitable having been produced at a cost of $143,000.

References

Bibliography 
 Rode, Alan K. Michael Curtiz: A Life in Film. University Press of Kentucky, 2017.

External links
 

Period advertisement

1929 films
Films directed by Michael Curtiz
1920s English-language films
1929 drama films
Lost American films
American black-and-white films
Warner Bros. films
American drama films
1929 lost films
Lost drama films
1920s American films
Films set in Philadelphia